Trans-Love Energies is a medical marijuana compassion center in Detroit, Michigan.

History
The organization began in Detroit during the early 1960s as a communal living environment, but later relocated to Ann Arbor, Michigan. Its founder was poet and political activist, John Sinclair. The commune consisted of two houses located side-by-side. Each house was home to a musical band, and to free-thinkers of the time, including members of the White Panther movement, the Ann Arbor Argus newspaper, and the MC5. The address of their 1486 Gratiot Ave. office is often considered the birthplace of Detroit techno as it housed Kevin Saunderson's KMS Recording in 1982.

Current role
The organization has narrowed its scope from the social activism of the 1960s to assisting persons who wish to use marijuana to cope with medical ailments.

References

Political activism
Organizations based in Ann Arbor, Michigan
Organizations established in the 1960s
Cannabis activism
Cannabis in Michigan
1960s establishments in Michigan